David McComb (born 7 June 1946) is a Canadian luger. He competed at the 1972 Winter Olympics and the 1976 Winter Olympics.

He is married to Teresa Bellefleur and has two sons. He resides in Quebec.

References

1946 births
Living people
Canadian male lugers
Olympic lugers of Canada
Lugers at the 1972 Winter Olympics
Lugers at the 1976 Winter Olympics
Sportspeople from Red Deer, Alberta